The 1995 DFB-Supercup, known as the Panasonic DFB-Supercup for sponsorship purposes, was the ninth DFB-Supercup, an annual football match contested by the winners of the previous season's Bundesliga and DFB-Pokal competitions.

The match was played at the Rheinstadion, Düsseldorf, and contested by league champions Borussia Dortmund and cup winners Borussia Mönchengladbach. Dortmund won 1–0 to secure their second Supercup title.

Teams

Match

Details

References

1995
Borussia Dortmund matches
Borussia Mönchengladbach matches
1995–96 in German football cups